Jagdwaffe, was the German Luftwaffe'''s fighter force during World War II.

Aircraft
The Jagdwaffe'' used many aircraft, including the Messerschmitt Bf 109, Bf 110, Me 163, Me 262, Focke-Wulf Fw 190, Ta 152, and Heinkel He 162.

References

Further reading
Luftwaffe Organization

Military units and formations of the Luftwaffe